The Palácio da Presidência da República (Portuguese for "Palace of the Presidency of the Republic") is a public building in the city centre of Praia, the capital of Cape Verde. It is situated on Rua Serpa Pinto, at the south end of Plateau, the historic district of Praia. It was constructed around 1894 in neoclassical style as a residence of the Portuguese governor of Cape Verde. After Cape Verde gained independence in 1975, it became the presidential palace.

See also
List of buildings and structures in Santiago, Cape Verde

References

Buildings and structures in Praia
Plateau of Praia
Presidential residences
Portuguese colonial architecture in Cape Verde